In mathematics, the direct image functor is a construction in sheaf theory that generalizes the global sections functor to the relative case. It is of fundamental importance in topology and algebraic geometry. Given a sheaf F defined on a topological space X and a continuous map f: X → Y, we can define a new sheaf f∗F on Y, called the direct image sheaf or the pushforward sheaf of F along f, such that the global sections of f∗F is given by the global sections of F. This assignment gives rise to a functor f∗ from the category of sheaves on X to the category of sheaves on Y, which is known as the direct image functor. Similar constructions exist in many other algebraic and geometric contexts, including that of quasi-coherent sheaves and étale sheaves on a scheme.

Definition
Let f: X → Y be a continuous map of topological spaces, and let Sh(–) denote the category of sheaves of abelian groups on a topological space. The direct image functor  

sends a sheaf F on X to its direct image presheaf f∗F on Y, defined on open subsets U of Y by

This turns out to be a sheaf on Y, and is called the direct image sheaf or pushforward sheaf of F along f.  

Since a morphism of sheaves φ: F → G on X gives rise to a morphism of sheaves f∗(φ): f∗(F) → f∗(G) on Y in an obvious way, we indeed have that f∗ is a functor.

Example 
If Y is a point, and f: X → Y the unique continuous map, then Sh(Y) is the category Ab of abelian groups, and the direct image functor f∗: Sh(X) → Ab equals the global sections functor.

Variants 
If dealing with sheaves of sets instead of sheaves of abelian groups, the same definition applies. Similarly, if f: (X, OX) → (Y, OY) is a morphism of ringed spaces, we obtain a direct image functor f∗: Sh(X,OX) → Sh(Y,OY) from the category of sheaves of OX-modules to the category of sheaves of OY-modules. Moreover, if f is now a morphism of quasi-compact and quasi-separated schemes, then f∗ preserves the property of being quasi-coherent, so we obtain the direct image functor between categories of quasi-coherent sheaves.

A similar definition applies to sheaves on topoi, such as étale sheaves. There, instead of the above preimage f−1(U), one uses the fiber product of U and X over Y.

Properties 
 Forming sheaf categories and direct image functors itself defines a functor from the category of topological spaces to the category of categories: given continuous maps f: X → Y and g: Y → Z, we have (gf)∗=g∗f∗.
 The direct image functor is right adjoint to the inverse image functor, which means that for any continuous  and sheaves  respectively on X, Y, there is a natural isomorphism:
.
 If f is the inclusion of a closed subspace X ⊆ Y then f∗ is exact.
 If f is the morphism of affine schemes  determined by a ring homomorphism , then the direct image functor f∗ on quasi-coherent sheaves identifies with the restriction of scalars functor along φ.

Higher direct images 

The direct image functor is left exact, but usually not right exact. Hence one can consider the right derived functors of the direct image. They are called higher direct images and denoted Rq f∗.

One can show that there is a similar expression as above for higher direct images: for a sheaf F on X, the sheaf Rq f∗(F) is the sheaf associated to the presheaf
,
where Hq denotes sheaf cohomology.

In the context of algebraic geometry and a morphism  of quasi-compact and quasi-separated schemes, one likewise has the right derived functor

as a functor between the (unbounded) derived categories of quasi-coherent sheaves. In this situation,  always admits a right adjoint . This is closely related, but not generally equivalent to, the exceptional inverse image functor , unless  is also proper.

See also 
Proper base change theorem

References

 , esp. section II.4

Sheaf theory
Theory of continuous functions